Damburneya is a genus of evergreen trees and shrubs in the laurel family (Lauraceae). It is native to tropical regions of North America and South America, with the center of diversity in Central America.

Damburneya consists of around 24 species. Species currently treated as Damburneya were historically treated under Nectandra until a 2016 phylogenetic study revealed Nectrandra to be polyphyletic.

Species
Species of Damburneya include:

Damburneya ambigens
Damburneya bicolor
Damburneya colorata
Damburneya coriacea
Damburneya cufodontisii
Damburneya gentlei
Damburneya guatemalensis
Damburneya inconspicua
Damburneya leucocome
Damburneya longicaudata
Damburneya longipetiolata
Damburneya martinicensis
Damburneya matudae
Damburneya minima
Damburneya mirafloris
Damburneya nitida
Damburneya parvissima
Damburneya patens
Damburneya purpurea
Damburneya rudis
Damburneya salicifolia
Damburneya salicina
Damburneya smithii
Damburneya umbrosa

References

 
Lauraceae genera
Taxa named by Constantine Samuel Rafinesque
Neotropical realm flora